PT Batik Air Indonesia, operating as Batik Air, is an Indonesian scheduled airline based at Soekarno Hatta International Airport in Jakarta, Indonesia. The airline was founded in 2012 as the full-service arm of the Lion Air Group and made its maiden flight on 3 May 2013 from Jakarta to Manado and Yogyakarta. The airline is certified as a 3-Star Airline by Skytrax.

History

Founding 
On November 18, 2011, Lion Air announced its intentions to enter the full service market with the announcement of a premium subsidiary by the name of Space Jet; the airline was to be a full-service subsidiary to compete with the Indonesian flag carrier, Garuda Indonesia, which at the time was the only operating full service carrier serving the Indonesian market. 

In June 2012, Batik Air was established, following a rename from Space Jet. The announcement was followed by Lion Air signed a commitment with Boeing for five 787 Dreamliners to be allocated to Batik, intending to have them delivered by 2015.

The airline began operations on May 3, 2013 using Boeing 737-900ERs leased from Lion Air, and at that point became the country's third full service carrier after Garuda Indonesia and the short-lived Pacific Royale Airways. Batik Air's 737-900ERs were equipped with a two-class seating configuration, replacing Lion Air's two-class 737-900ER service.

In 2014, Lion Air cancelled the Boeing 787s deal with Boeing and indefinitely shelved plans for the long-haul expansion of Batik Air, citing the airline's inclusion in the EU Airline Blacklist at the time. In June 2016, the airline was removed from the EU Blacklist, together with its parent Lion Air.

Expansion 

In November 2019, Batik Air received its first wide-body aircraft, a single Airbus A330-300, transferred from Thai Lion Air. The airline announced its intention to use the aircraft to fly to Saudi Arabia, carrying umrah passengers to Jeddah and Medina, complementing Lion Air's existing service. Medina later became the airline's first long haul route when it launched flights from Surabaya carrying hajj pilgrims on December 17 of that year. In February 2020, the aircraft was used to repatriate Indonesian nationals from Wuhan during the early stages of the COVID-19 pandemic. Controversy arose in which members of the People's Representative Council questioned the decision to have Batik Air operate the repatriation flight in place of the state-owned Garuda Indonesia; the Indonesian Ministry of Transportation later issued a statement justifying the choice, citing Batik's existing permit to fly to Wuhan. 

On 27 April 2022, Lion Air Group's Malaysian full service subsidiary, Malindo Air, rebranded as Batik Air Malaysia, adopting a common identity with the existing Batik Air. The then-CEO of Batik Air (Indonesia), Capt. Achmad Luftie announced Batik Air Malaysia functioning as an international complement to the Indonesian arm, using Kuala Lumpur as a transit point beyond South East Asia for Batik Air passengers. In May 2022, the airline announced plans to expand its international network from Ngurah Rai International Airport in Bali.

In December 2022, Batik Air, along with the other Lion Air Group airlines, relocated its main base to Terminal 2 at Soekarno Hatta International Airport, consolidating the operation of the entire group at the terminal. In the same year, Batik Air together with Lion Air is reported to have a combined market share of 44% out of Soekarno Hatta International Airport, in terms of seat capacity and flight frequencies.

In February 2023, the airline was ranked fourth out of the seven airlines that were included in a survey of Indonesian people listing their favourite airlines conducted by Jakpat.

Destinations

As of February 2023, Batik Air operates 52 domestic and international destinations, with a frequency of over 350 flights daily. International destinations included Singapore, Bangkok, Kuala Lumpur, Penang, as well as Melbourne, Perth, and Sydney. The airline also operates charters to Guilin, Nanning, Kunming and Shenzhen in China.

The airline chiefly focuses on operating within the Indonesian domestic market, which makes up of 90% of its scheduled capacity.

Codeshare agreements 
Batik air codeshares with the following airlines:

Emirates

Fleet

Current fleet 
, the Batik Air fleet consists of the following aircraft:

Former fleet 

 6 Boeing 737-900ER

Services 
Batik Air operates as a full service carrier, featuring two classes of service—business class and economy class—on all flights.

Cabins

Business class 

Business class is available on all Batik Air aircraft. On narrow body aircraft, the business class cabin is equipped with 12 recliner seats in a 2-2 configuration featuring a 38 inch (96.5 cm) pitch, along with charging ports and individual touch screen IFE monitors. On the Airbus A330-300 aircraft, the business class cabin consists of 18 angle-flat seats in a 2-2-2 configuration, each equipped with personal IFE monitors. Meals and refreshments, and amenities including headphones are provided to all business class passengers. All business class passengers are also offered lounge access at select airports.

Economy class 

Economy class is offered on all aircraft. Seats are in a 3-3 configuration on narrow body aircraft and in a 3-3-3 configuration on the Airbus A330-300. Inflight entertainment is available to economy class passengers through personal IFE monitors as well as through the Batik Entertainment wireless streaming service. All passengers are offered complimentary snacks and meals.

Lounge 

Batik Air operates two lounges, one being at Soekarno Hatta International Airport and another at Halim Perdana Kusuma International Airport. The lounges are open only to passengers travelling in business class, offering food and drinks and wireless internet.

On 28 October 2022, the lounge in Soekarno Hatta International Airport caught fire, traced to an electrical short circuit in the lounge's wiring. Nobody was hurt in the incident.

Incidents and accidents
 On 6 November 2015, Batik Air Flight 6380, a Boeing 737-9GP(ER) PK-LBO, overran the runway on landing by 100 meters at Yogyakarta Airport which caused the nose gear to collapse. 16 injuries were reported.
 On 4 April 2016, Batik Air Flight 7703, operated by a Boeing 737-8GP(WL) with registration PK-LBS, collided with an ATR-42-600 aircraft on takeoff from runway 24 at Jakarta-Halim Perdana Kusuma Airport (HLP), Indonesia. The ATR-42-600, operated by TransNusa and registered PK-TNJ, was towed. No casualties were reported.

See also
 Wings Air
 Rusdi Kirana
 List of airlines of Indonesia
 Aviation in Indonesia

References

External links

Airlines of Indonesia
Lion Air
Airlines established in 2012
Companies based in Jakarta
Indonesian brands
Indonesian companies established in 2012